The Apostolic Nunciature to the Czech Republic the diplomatic mission of the Holy See to the Czech Republic. It is located in Prague. The current Apostolic Nuncio is Archbishop Jude Thaddeus Okolo, who was named to the position by Pope Francis on 1 May 2022.

The nunciature is an ecclesiastical office of the Catholic Church in the Czech Republic, with the rank of an embassy. The nuncio serves both as the ambassador of the Holy See to the President of the Czech Republic, and as delegate and point-of-contact between the Catholic hierarchy in the Czech Republic and the pope.

Nuncios
Archbishop Giovanni Coppa was named Apostolic Nuncio to Czechoslovakia on 30 June 1990. With the division on that country into Slovakia and the Czech Republic on 1 January 1993, Coppa became nuncio to each of them, based in Prague.

 Giovanni Coppa (1 January 1993 – 19 May 2001)
 Erwin Josef Ender (19 May 2001 – 25 November 2003)
 Diego Causero (10 January 2004 – 28 May 2011)
 Giuseppe Leanza (15 September 2011 – 21 September 2018)
 Charles Daniel Balvo (21 September 2018 – 17 January 2022)
 Jude Thaddeus Okolo (1 May 2022 – present)

See also
Apostolic Nunciature to Slovakia
Apostolic Nunciature to Czechoslovakia
List of diplomatic missions of the Holy See
List of diplomatic missions in the Czech Republic
Foreign relations of the Holy See
Roman Catholicism in the Czech Republic

References

Czech
Catholic Church in the Czech Republic